Janina Konarska (later Konarska-Słonimska, April 30, 1900 – June 9, 1975) was a Polish artist. She was born in Warsaw and was the wife of Antoni Słonimski.

In 1932 she won a silver medal in the art competitions of the Olympic Games for her woodcut "Narciarze" ("Skier").

References 

 
 
 
 

1900 births
1975 deaths
Olympic silver medalists in art competitions
Medalists at the 1932 Summer Olympics
Artists from Warsaw
Olympic competitors in art competitions